The Charlie Conacher Humanitarian Award (or Charlie Conacher Memorial Trophy) was an award given to a National Hockey League (NHL) player who made "outstanding contribution to humanitarian or community service projects". It was established in 1968–69 in the memory of Hockey Hall of Fame player Charlie Conacher, who died of throat cancer in 1967, and featured an annual benefit dinner that raised money for the Charlie Conacher Research Fund for Cancer. The award was not affiliated with the NHL, though it was given to one of the league's players.

Toronto Maple Leafs captain George Armstrong was the first winner, named following the  season. Co-winners were named on two occasions, as Jean Beliveau and Bobby Orr shared the award in 1970–71, as did Jimmy Peters, Jr. and Gary Bergman in 1972–73.  Calgary Flames forward Lanny McDonald was announced as the winner of the award at the 1982–83 Conacher Hockey Awards dinner, though he was actually the runner-up to Boston Bruins defenceman Brad Park.  The mistake was cleared up a few days after the dinner.

Calgary's Jim Peplinski was named the final recipient of the award in 1983–84, after which the trophy was retired and put on display at the newly constructed Charlie Conacher Research Centre for cancer at the Toronto General Hospital.  Former Chicago Blackhawks star Stan Mikita was given a special award at that final banquet in recognition of his work with the hearing impaired. The benefit dinners held in conjunction with the award raised over $2 million towards throat cancer research in the 17 years that they were held.  Two years after the Conacher Award was retired, Maple Leafs owner Harold Ballard presented the NHL with the King Clancy Memorial Trophy, also to be given to the league's top humanitarian. The new trophy was first awarded in 1987–88.

Winners

References

Cancer fundraisers
Humanitarian and service awards
National Hockey League trophies and awards